Fraser–Winter Park station is a train station in Fraser, Colorado. It is served by Amtrak's California Zephyr, which runs once daily in each direction between Chicago, and Emeryville, California, in the San Francisco Bay Area. The station house is unstaffed, except during the winter months.

References

External links

Fraser–Winter Park, CO – USA RailGuide (TrainWeb)

Amtrak stations in Colorado
Stations along Denver and Rio Grande Western Railroad lines
Transportation buildings and structures in Grand County, Colorado